Chamaelaucium micranthum is a member of the myrtle family, Myrtaceae, endemic to Western Australia.

It blooms between August and November producing white flowers.

Found along creek beds and banks extending from the Mid West to the central Wheatbelt regions of Western Australia where it grows in sandy soils.

References

micranthum
Plants described in 1923